M. T. C. Cronin (born 1963) is a contemporary Australian poet.

MTC Cronin has published more than twenty books (poetry, prose poems and essays) including several collections jointly written with the Australian poet and translator, Peter Boyle and another with Melbourne-based librettist and poet, Maria Zajkowski.

Forthcoming books

New & Selected Poems (Puncher & Wattmann, Newcastle, Australia, 2022–23)ISBN

Bibliography

Poetry
Zoetrope: we see us moving (Five Islands, Wollongong, Australia, 1995) 
the world beyond the fig (Five Islands, Wollongong, Australia, 1998, shortlisted CJ Dennis Prize for Poetry, Victorian Premier's Literary Awards 1999) 
Everything Holy (Balcones International Press, Temple, USA, 1998, shortlisted Jessie Litchfield Award for Literature 1997; shortlisted Age Book of the Year 1999; shortlisted Judith Wright Calanthe Prize for Poetry, Qld Premier's Literary Awards 1999; shortlisted Kenneth Slessor Prize for Poetry, NSW Premier's Literary Awards 2000; commended Wesley Michel Wright Prize for Poetry 1999)  (review)
Mischief-Birds (Vagabond Press, Sydney, Australia, 1999)
Bestseller (Vagabond Press, Sydney, Australia, 2001, shortlisted John Bray Poetry Award, South Australian Festival Awards for Literature 2002; shortlisted Age Book of the Year 2002) 
Talking to Neruda's Questions (Vagabond Press, Sydney, Australia, 2001,  online at www.shearsman.com
My Lover's Back (UQP, St Lucia, Australia, 2002, shortlisted John Bray Poetry Award, South Australian Festival Awards for Literature 2004) 
The Confetti Stone and other poems (Picaro Press, Warner's Bay, Australia, 2002) ISSN 1444-8424
beautiful, unfinished ~ PARABLE/SONG/CANTO/POEM (Salt, Cambridge, UK, 2003, Book of the Month, Shearsman Books, UK, August 2003; shortlisted Kenneth Slessor Prize for Poetry, NSW Premier's Literary Awards 2004) 
<More or Less Than>  1-100 (Shearsman, Exeter, UK, 2004, shortlisted Kenneth Slessor Prize for Poetry, NSW Premier's Literary Awards 2005; shortlisted Age Book of the Year 2005; winner CJ Dennis Prize for Poetry, Victorian Premier's Literary Awards 2005; winner Award for Innovation in Writing, South Australian Festival Awards for Literature 2006 )  excerpts 1-13, 88-100
The Flower, the Thing (UQP, St Lucia, Australia, 2006, shortlisted WARM Literary Awards Book of the Year 2007) 
Our Life is a Box. / Prayers Without a God (Soi 3, Chiang Mai/Brisbane, Australia/Thailand, 2007)
Notebook of Signs (& 3 Other Small Books) (Shearsman, Exeter, UK, 2007) 
How Does a Man Who is Dead Reinvent His Body? (The Belated Love Poems of Thean Morris Caelli) (co-written with Peter Boyle, Shearsman Books, Exeter, UK, 2008) 
Irrigations (of the Human Heart) ~ Fictional Essays on the Poetics of Living, Art & Love (Ravenna Press, Edmonds, USA, 200) 
Squeezing Desire Through a Sieve ~ micro-essays on judgement & justice (Puncher & Wattmann, Sydney, Australia, 2009, shortlisted Award for Innovation in Writing, South Australian Festival Awards for Literature 2010) 
The World Last Night [metaphors for death] (UQP, St Lucia, Australia, 2012, highly commended, Prime Minister's Literary Awards 2013) 
in possession of loss (Shearsman, Exeter, UK, 2014) 
The Law of Poetry (Puncher & Wattmann, Sydney, Australia, 2015) 
Causal ~ speaking the future (Spuyten Duyvil, New York, USA, 2018) 
Sometimes the Soul (The Sophia Lexicon Press, Maleny, Australia, 2019)
God is Waiting in the World's Yard (Puncher & Wattmann, Newcastle, Australia, 2019) 
What We Have Except When We are Lost (co-written with Maria Zajkowski, Spuyten Duyvil, New York, USA, 2020) 
A Ticket to Trilce (Shearsman, Exeter, UK, 2021)  
Who Was By Alex Quel (co-written with Peter Boyle, Puncher & Wattmann, Newcastle, Australia, 2022)

In translation
Respondiendo a las Preguntas de Neruda in Spanish and English, trans. Juan Garrido Salgado (Safo, Santiago, Chile, 2004) 
Controcanto al Libro Delle Domande di Neruda in Italian and English, trans. Hans Kitzmuller (Braitan, Brazzano, Italy, 2005) 
The Ridiculous Shape of Longing: New and Selected Poems in English and Macedonian, trans. Igor Isakovski (Blesok, Skopje, Macedonia, 2005)

External sources
 at Caesura
4 poems at softblow.org
4 poems at P76 Magazine Issue 6
MTC Cronin at Poetry International Web
2 Poems
8 poems at Jack Magazine
Review by John Bennett
Launch speech by Peter Boyle for The Law of Poetry in Rochford Street Review
 Interview with MTC Cronin on Regime Books' Australian Poetry Podcast

References
MTC Cronin at Thylazine Artists and Writers Directory

1963 births
Living people
Australian women poets
Writers from Queensland
20th-century Australian poets
21st-century Australian poets